Wolf Run is a tributary of North Branch Mehoopany Creek in Bradford County and Sullivan County, in Pennsylvania, in the United States. In a 2001 study, seven species of fish were found in Wolf Run, but no gamefish. More recently, wild trout have been observed as well.

Course
Wolf Run begins in a shallow valley near a wetland in Wilmot Township, Bradford County. It flows south-southeast for a few tenths of a mile before entering an unnamed lake. From the southern outlet of this lake, the stream flows south-southeast for more than a mile before entering Colley Township, Sullivan County, where it receives an unnamed tributary from the left. It then turns south-southwest for about a mile before crossing Pennsylvania Route 87 and reaching its confluence with North Branch Mehoopany Creek.

Hydrology
Wolf Run is not designated as an impaired waterbody.

Geography and geology

It flows in a generally southerly direction.

A mountain known as Tyler Mountain is located just to the east of Wolf Run.

Watershed
The stream is entirely within the United States Geological Survey quadrangle of Colley. It joins North Branch Mehoopany Creek at Colley.

The main land uses in the watershed of Wolf Run are agricultural land and woodlots. A total of 18 percent of the stream's length is within  of a road, while 75 percent is within  of a road and 98 percent is within   of one. In 2000, the population density of the stream's watershed was 7 people per square kilometer (18 per square mile), making it the most densely populated watershed of any named tributary of North Branch Mehoopany Creek.

History
Wolf Run was entered into the Geographic Names Information System on August 2, 1979. Its identifier in the Geographic Names Information System is 1191677.

In 2001, Pennsylvania Fish and Boat Commission biologists visited Wolf Run and performed a fish sampling, among other research. The stream was found to be too warm for wild trout and too narrow to qualify for the statewide trout stocking program.

Biology
Wild trout naturally reproduce in Wolf Run from its headwaters downstream to its mouth. The stream is classified as a Coldwater Fishery.

However, in a 2001 study, no game fish were observed in Wolf Run, though seven other fish species were found. These species include central stoneroller, common shiner, blacknose dace, creek chub, white sucker, pumpkinseed, and tessellated darter.

See also
Smith Cabin Run, next tributary of North Branch Mehoopany Creek going downstream
List of rivers of Pennsylvania

References

Tributaries of North Branch Mehoopany Creek